Я Не Волшебник (Transliteration: Ya Nye Volshyebnik, English translation: "I'm Not a Magician") is an unofficial compilation album of Dmitry Koldun, a popular singer from Belarus. The album is available, and was primarily only available, in MP3 format. It was later made available as a physical release.

Although the album was allowed to be sold commercially and feature Koldun songs it remains an unofficial album and is, therefore, not considered to be Koldun's first album, which instead refers to the album named Koldum which was released in 2009.

Most singles are from Koldun's participation in Star Factory, although some are officially released singles of Koldun after this period.

The album originally consisted of only 12 songs but due to the popularity of Work Your Magic two more songs were added. Both songs are remixes of the original song and one is in Russian.

Track listing

Translated track list
English track titles

 I For You
 Never
 Reality of Dreams
 Princess
 Girl of My Dreams
 I do not Die Without Your Love
 Angel of Dreams
 I Would Wait
 Waltz Boston
 Living In Rhythm Dance
 Eternal Flame
 You Fly Away
 Give Me Power (Zoloto Remix)
 Work Your Magic (Remix)

Singles released
Officially released singles that feature on the album include:
 Work Your Magic/Дай Мне Силу (though not a remixed version)
 Я Для Тебя
 Царевна

References

External links
Official Website 
Official forum 
Unofficial forum

Dmitry Koldun albums
2008 compilation albums